The James Phinney House is a historic house northeast of the corner of Hall and Blaney Roads in rural northeastern Chester County, South Carolina.  It is a -story clapboarded wood-frame structure with a side gable roof and end chimneys.  It has a projecting gabled four-post Greek Revival portico sheltering the entrance, which is framed by sidelight and transom windows.  The house was built about 1856, and is a well-preserved example of rural domestic Greek Revival architecture, a form that is not particularly common in the state.

The house was listed on the National Register of Historic Places in 2016.

See also
National Register of Historic Places listings in Chester County, South Carolina

References

Houses on the National Register of Historic Places in South Carolina
Houses completed in 1856
Houses in Chester County, South Carolina
National Register of Historic Places in Chester County, South Carolina